Catherine Johnson FRSL (born 1962) is a British author and screenwriter. She has written several young adult novels and co-wrote the screenplay for the 2004 drama film Bullet Boy (directed by and co-written with Saul Dibb).

Background and career 
Catherine Johnson was born in London, England, in 1962. Her father was Jamaican and her mother was Welsh. Johnson grew up in North London and attended Tetherdown Primary School. Later she studied film at St Martin's School of Art, before turning to writing.

Her first book, The Last Welsh Summer, was published by Welsh publisher Pont Books in 1993. She has since written and published 20 novels. In 1999 her book Landlocked was honoured as an International Youth Library White Raven book. Other accolades include the 2014 Young Quills Award for best historical fiction for over-12s for her 2013 book Sawbones, which was also shortlisted for the Rotherham Book Award, the Salford Children's Book Prize and the Hoo Kids Book Award. Johnson won the 2019 Little Rebels Award for Radical Children's Fiction for her 2018 book Freedom.

Johnson has been a Royal Literary Fund Fellow at the London Institute, a Writer in Residence at Holloway Prison and a Reader in Residence at the Royal Festival Hall's Imagine Children's Literature Festival. She has served as a judge for the Jhalak Prize, first awarded in 2017.

In 2019, she was elected a Fellow of the Royal Society of Literature.

Johnson is a contributor to the 2019 anthology New Daughters of Africa, edited by Margaret Busby.

Bibliography 
The Last Welsh Summer. Llandysul: Pont, 1993
Sophie's Ghost. Llandysul: Pont, 1994
Other Colours. London: Livewire, 1997
Landlocked. Llandysul: Pont, 1999
In Black and White. Oxford: Oxford University Press, 2000
Hero. Oxford: Oxford University Press, 2001
Stella. Oxford: Oxford University Press, 2002
Face Value. Oxford: Oxford University Press, 2005
Cuts Deep. London: Evans, 2007
The Dying Game. Oxford: Oxford University Press, 2007
A Nest of Vipers. London: Corgi, 2008
Arctic Hero. Edinburgh: Barrington Stoke, 2008
Con Men. Edinburgh: Barrington Stoke, 2009
The Munro Inheritance. London: Corgi, 2009
Nightmare Card. Edinburgh: Barrington Stoke, 2011
Brave New Girl. London: Frances Lincoln Children's Books, 2011
Sawbones. London: Walker Books Ltd, 2013
The Curious Tale of the Lady Caraboo. London: Corgi Books, 2015
Blade and Bone, London: Walker Books, 2016
Freedom, Scholastic, 2018
Riding the Tempest, 2018
Race to the Frozen North: The Matthew Henson Story, 2018

Awards 
1999: IBBY White Raven Award - Landlocked
1999: Wales Book of the Year Award (shortlist) - Landlocked
2002: Hampshire Book Award (shortlist) - Stella
2008: Leeds Book of the Year Award (shortlist) - A Nest of Vipers
2008: Phoenix Book Award (shortlist) - A Nest of Vipers
2009: Birmingham KS3 Chills Award (shortlist) - Arctic Hero
2014: Young Quills Award for best historical fiction for over-12s – Sawbones
2019: Little Rebels Award for Radical Children's Fiction — Freedom

References

External links
 Official website

1962 births
Living people
20th-century British women writers
21st-century British women writers
Alumni of Saint Martin's School of Art
Black British women writers
English children's writers
English people of Jamaican descent
English people of Welsh descent
Fellows of the Royal Society of Literature